Bangor Mall is a  shopping mall in Bangor, Maine, United States.

Located off the Stillwater Avenue exit on Interstate 95, it serves as a shopping center for the surrounding Bangor area. Current stores include JCPenney and Dick's Sporting Goods with one anchor space standing empty and another Previous anchors include Sears, which closed in 2018, Macy's (originally Filene's that opened in 1998), which closed in 2017 and became Furniture, Mattress And More in 2018, and Porteous, which closed in 2003 and became Dick's Sporting Goods in 2004. The former Sear's space stands now stands condemned for building code violations after a convicted fraudster attempted to convert it into a used car dealership.

The Bangor Mall is managed by Namdar Realty Group, who acquired the mall for $12.6 million in 2019 after Simon Property Group defaulted on an $80 million loan.

 Built in 1977 on a former dairy farm and opened in October 1978, it sits on Stillwater Avenue north of Bangor's central business district. It can be reached from nearby Interstate 95 via exits 186 and 187. In 1998, Filene's opened its store in the mall, during the 1996-1998 renovation.

References

External links

Buildings and structures in Bangor, Maine
Shopping malls established in 1978
Shopping malls in Maine
Tourist attractions in Bangor, Maine
1978 establishments in Maine
Namdar Realty Group